Cima is a genus of minute sea snails, marine gastropod molluscs in the family Cimidae.

Species
 Cima apicisbelli Rolán, 2003
 Cima cuticulata Warén, 1993
 Cima cylindrica (Jeffreys, 1856)
 Cima diminuta Rolán & Rubio, 2018
 Cima inconspicua Warén, 1993
 Cima mingoranceae Rolán & Swinnen, 2014
 Cima minima (Jeffreys, 1858)
 † Cima neglecta (A. W. Janssen, 1969) 
 † Cima oligocaenica Lozouet, 2015 
 † Cima planorbiformis Lozouet, 2015 
 † Cima proneglecta (R. Janssen, 1978) 
 †  Cima tenuispina Lozouet, 2015 
 Cima urdunensis Bandel, 2005
 † Cima virodunensis Lozouet, 2015 
Species brought into synonymy
 Cima gantensis Bandel, 2005: synonym of Mifsudia gantensis (Bandel, 2005) † (original combination)
 Cima melitensis Mifsud, 1998: synonym of Mifsudia melitensis (Mifsud, 1998) (original combination)
 Cima ventricosa (Forbes, 1844): synonym of Eulimella ventricosa (Forbes, 1844)

References

 Graham, A., 1988. Molluscs: Prosobranch and Pyramidellid Gastropods. Brill/Backhuys.Linnean Society of London. 662 pp.
 Poppe, G. T. & Goto, Y., 1991. European Seashells. vol 1. Christa Hemmen, Darmstadt. 352 pp
 Rolán, E., 1983. Moluscos de la Ría de Vigo, 1 Gasterópodos.Thalassas, 1 (1), supl. 1: 1-383
 Gofas, S.; Le Renard, J.; Bouchet, P. (2001). Mollusca, in: Costello, M.J. et al. (Ed.) (2001). European register of marine species: a check-list of the marine species in Europe and a bibliography of guides to their identification. Collection Patrimoines Naturels, 50: pp. 180–213
 Warén, A., 1993. New and little known mollusca from Iceland and Scandinavia. Part 2.Sarsia 78: 159-201
 Rolán, E., 2003. A new species of the genus Cima (Gastropoda, Cimidae) from Senegal. Novapex 4(1): 21-23
 Spencer, H.; Marshall. B. (2009). All Mollusca except Opisthobranchia. In: Gordon, D. (Ed.) (2009). New Zealand Inventory of Biodiversity. Volume One: Kingdom Animalia. 584 pp
 Emilio ROLÁN & Frank SWINNEN (2014), A new species in the genus Cima  (Prosobranchia: Cimidae) from Senegal; Gloria Maris 53 (1), 2014

External links

 Chaster G.W. (1896). Some new marine mollusca from Tangier. Journal of Malacology. 5(1): 1-4, pl. 1
 Gastropods.com : Cimidae; accessed : 11 July 2011

Cimidae
Gastropod genera